The IV SS Panzer Corps was a panzer corps of the Waffen-SS which saw action on the Eastern Front and in the Balkans during World War II.

History
The corps was formed in August 1943 in Poitiers, France. The formation was originally to be a skeleton formation to supervise those SS divisions that were being reformed as SS panzer divisions.

On 30 June 1944, the formation absorbed the VII SS Panzer Corps and was reformed as a headquarters for the 3rd SS Panzer Division Totenkopf and the 5th SS Panzer Division Wiking. The corps was placed under the command of former Wiking commander SS-Obergruppenführer Herbert Otto Gille.

The corps was placed into the line around Warsaw, Poland, where it saw action against the Red Army as a part of the 9th Army. In August, 1944, elements of the corps took part in the suppression of the Warsaw Uprising. After holding the line near Warsaw, the corps was pushed back to the area near Modlin, where it saw heavy fighting until December.

When SS-Obergruppenführer Karl Pfeffer Wildenbruch's IX SS Mountain Corps and large numbers of Hungarian troops were encircled in Budapest in December 1944, the corps was shifted south from Army Group A to join 6th Army and to take part in the relief efforts. The operations were named Konrad. In Operation Konrad III, the largest of the relief operations, IV SS Panzer Corps destroyed all the tanks of the Soviet 3rd Ukrainian Front in an intense two-week battle in Transdanubia but could not relieve the city.

After the failure of Operation Konrad III, the corps was moved west to the area around Lake Balaton, where it was responsible for defending the left flank of the Operation Spring Awakening (Frühlingserwachen), near Stuhlweissenberg. After the failure of this operation, the Soviet Vienna Offensive tore a gap between the IV SS-Panzerkorps and the neighboring Third Hungarian Army. After escaping an encirclement thanks to the efforts of the 9th SS Panzer Division Hohenstaufen, the corps withdrew towards Vienna. The remnants of the corps surrendered to the Americans on 9 May 1945.

Commanders
 SS-Obergruppenführer Alfred Wünnenberg (5 August 1943 - 23 October 1943)
 SS-Obergruppenführer Walter Krüger (23 October 1943 - 1 July 1944)
 SS-Obergruppenführer Matthias Kleinheisterkamp (1 July 1944 - 20 July 1944)
 SS-Brigadeführer Nikolaus Heilmann (20 July 1944 - 6 August 1944)
 SS-Obergruppenfuhrer Herbert Otto Gille (6 August 1944 - 8 May 1945)

Orders of battle
September 16, 1944 - Defence of Modlin
 Corps staff
 Gruppe von dem Bach
  19th Panzer Division
  3rd SS Panzer Division Totenkopf
  5th SS Panzer Division Wiking
  73rd Infantry Division
 Hungarian 1st Cavalry Division
 104/504th Launcher Battalion
 504th Heavy SS Artillery Battalion
 104th SS Corps Intelligence Department
 104th SS Medical Battalion
 IV SS Panzer Corps Field Training Battalion
 504th Motor Vehicle Company
 504th Garment Repair Train
 104th SS Military Post Office

January 17, 1945 - Operation Konrad III (Budapest)
 Corps staff
  3rd SS Panzer Division Totenkopf
  5th SS Panzer Division Wiking
  1st Panzer Division
  3rd Panzer Division
  509th Heavy Panzer Battalion
 24th Panzer Detachment
 1335th StuG Detachment
 219th Sturmpanzer Detachment
 17th Volks Rocket Brigade
 104/504th Launcher Battalion
 504th Heavy SS Artillery Battalion
 104th SS Corps Intelligence Department
 104th SS Medical Battalion
 IV SS Panzer Corps Field Training Battalion
 504th Motor Vehicle Company
 504th Garment Repair Train
 104th SS Military Post Office

March 1, 1945 - Operation Frühlingserwachen
 Corps staff
  3rd SS Panzer Division Totenkopf
  5th SS Panzer Division Wiking
 356th Infantry Division
 104/504th Launcher Battalion
 504th Heavy SS Artillery Battalion
 104th SS Corps Intelligence Department
 104th SS Medical Battalion
 IV SS Panzer Corps Field Training Battalion
 504th Motor Vehicle Company
 504th Garment Repair Train
 104th SS Military Post Office

Citations

References

 
 

Waffen-SS corps
IV SS Panzer Corps
Military units and formations disestablished in 1945